The Abia State Ministry of Agriculture is a branch of the Abia State Government. It is the apex body for the formulation and administration of the rules and regulations and laws relating to agriculture in Abia State.

See also
Abia State Government

References

Government ministries of Abia State
Abia